Victor Joe Alexander (born August 31, 1969) is an American former professional basketball player. Listed at 6'10" (2.08 m) tall, and 273 pounds (124 kg) in weight, he played as a center and power forward.

College career
Alexander was considered one of the top low-post scorers in Iowa State history. The burly center was named a First-Team All-Big Eight choice in 1989 and 1991, and his 1,892 career points scored ranks fourth all-time in the school's history.  He led the Big Eight in field goal percentage in 1991, at 65.9 percent.  As of 2010, Alexander still held the Iowa State University career highest field goal percentage record (min. 200 made), at 61.1 percent (778 out of 1,274).

In 2017, Alexander was inducted into the Iowa State Hall of Fame as well their all century basketball team.

Professional career

NBA
Alexander was selected by the Golden State Warriors, in the first round (17th pick overall) of the 1991 NBA Draft, after playing college basketball at Iowa State University. Alexander played five seasons in the National Basketball Association (NBA), mainly with the Golden State Warriors, from 1991 to 1995. The Warriors traded him to the Toronto Raptors, along with other players, for B. J. Armstrong, in 1995, but he never officially played for the Raptors.

Toronto traded him first to the Cleveland Cavaliers (he failed the physical and the trade was rescinded), and eventually to the New York Knicks. The Knicks waived Alexander before he played for them. He had a brief stint with the Detroit Pistons, during the 2001–02 season. In his NBA career, Alexander played in a total of 286 games, and averaged 8.9 points per game.

Europe
Alexander also played overseas, for top teams in Greece (AEK Athens and PAOK), Israel (Maccabi Tel Aviv), Spain (TAU Ceramica) and Russia (CSKA Moscow). During his career in Europe, he played in 115 EuroLeague games, over 6 EuroLeague seasons. His performances with CSKA earned him an All-EuroLeague First Team selection, in 2003.

Career statistics

EuroLeague

|-
| style="text-align:left;"| 2000–01 
| style="text-align:left;"| Tau Ceramica
| 22 || 20 || 30.0 || .400 || .250 || .740 || 7.0 || .7 || .9 || .4 || 13.5 || 14.5
|-
| style="text-align:left;"| 2002–03 
| style="text-align:left;"| CSKA Moscow
| 15 || 14 || 30.4 || .415 || .308 || .674 || 6.6 || 1.1 || 1.1 || .1 || 16.6 || 16.0
|-
| style="text-align:left;"| 2003–04 
| style="text-align:left;"| CSKA Moscow
| 19 || 15 || 18.2 || .525 || .500 || .689 || 3.2 || .3 || .7 || .3 || 9.3 || 7.9
|-class="sortbottom"
| style="text-align:center;" colspan="2"| Career
| 56 || 49 || 26.1 || .460 || .370 || .707 || 5.6 || .7 || .9 || .1 || 12.9 || 12.7

NBA

Regular season

|-
| align="left" | 1991–92
| align="left" | Golden State
| 80 || 28 || 16.9 || .529 || .000 || .691 || 4.2 || .4 || .6 || .8 || 7.4
|-
| align="left" | 1992–93
| align="left" | Golden State
| 72 || 59 || 24.3 || .516 || .455 || .685 || 5.8 || 1.3 || .5 || .7 || 11.2
|-
| align="left" | 1993–94
| align="left" | Golden State
| 69 || 39 || 19.1 || .530 || .154 || .527 || 4.5 || 1.0 || .4 || .5 || 8.7
|-
| align="left" | 1994–95
| align="left" | Golden State 
| 50 || 29 || 24.7 || .515 || .240 || .600 || 5.8 || 1.2 || .6 || .6 || 10.0
|-
| align="left" | 2001–02
| align="left" | Detroit
| 15 || 0 || 6.5 || .353 || .000 || .500 || 1.9 || .4 || .0 || .1 || 2.7
|- 
|-class="sortbottom"
| style="text-align:center;" colspan="2"| Career
| 286 || 155 || 20.1 || .518 || .286 || .634 || 4.8 || .9 || .5 || .6 || 8.9

Playoffs 

|-
| align="left" | 1992
| align="left" | Golden State
| 4 || 0 || 6.0 || .600 || .000 || 1.000 || 1.5 || .3 || .5 || .0 || 1.8
|-
| align="left" | 2002
| align="left" | Detroit
| 1 || 0 || 3.0 || .000 || .000 || .000 || 1.0 || .0 || .0 || .0 || 0.0
|-
|-class="sortbottom"
| style="text-align:center;" colspan="2"| Career 
| 5 || 0 || 5.4 || .500 || .000 || 1.000 || 1.4 || .2 || .4 || .0 || 1.4

References

External links 
NBA.com Profile
Euroleague.net Profile
FIBA EuroLeague Profile
Spanish League Profile 

1969 births
Living people
AEK B.C. players
American expatriate basketball people in Argentina
American expatriate basketball people in Greece
American expatriate basketball people in Israel
American expatriate basketball people in Russia
American expatriate basketball people in Spain
American men's basketball players
Atléticos de San Germán players
Basketball players from Detroit
Baloncesto Málaga players
Centers (basketball)
Denby High School alumni
Detroit Pistons players
Golden State Warriors draft picks
Golden State Warriors players
Iowa State Cyclones men's basketball players
Israeli Basketball Premier League players
Liga ACB players
Maccabi Tel Aviv B.C. players
Medalists at the 1989 Summer Universiade
P.A.O.K. BC players
PBC CSKA Moscow players
Power forwards (basketball)
Saski Baskonia players
Universiade medalists in basketball
Universiade gold medalists for the United States